Kathleen Finneran (born December 3, 1957 in St. Louis, Missouri), is an American author. She wrote the book-length family memoir The Tender Land (Houghton-Mifflin, 2000). Finneran received a Whiting Award in 2001 and a Guggenheim Fellowship in 2003.

She teaches at Washington University in St. Louis and was a guest professor at the University of Missouri-St. Louis, where she led workshops on memoir and personal essay.

On May 17, 2010, Kathleen Finneran awarded Christopher Bachmann and Tony Minnick from St. Louis University High School, an award for exemplary and outstanding literary work.

References

External links
Profile at The Whiting Foundation

1957 births
Living people
Washington University in St. Louis faculty
American memoirists
American women memoirists
American biographers
University of Missouri–St. Louis faculty